Nancy Cartwright, Lady Hampshire,  (born 24 June 1944) is an American philosopher of science. She is a professor of philosophy at the University of California at San Diego and the University of Durham. Currently, she is the President of the Division for Logic, Methodology and Philosophy of Science and Technology of the International Union of History and Philosophy of Science and Technology.

Education and career 
Cartwright earned her BSc from the University of Pittsburgh in mathematics and her Ph.D. in philosophy at the University of Illinois at Chicago (Congress Circle campus). Her thesis was on the concept of mixture in quantum mechanics. Before taking her current appointments, she taught at the University of Maryland, Stanford University and the London School of Economics. She has held visiting appointments at the University of Oslo, Princeton University, Caltech, the University of Pittsburgh, the University of Cambridge and UCLA. She is currently Tsing Hua Honorary Distinguished Chair Professor at the National Tsing Hua University in Taiwan and Visiting Research Fellow at Ca' Foscari University in Venice. She co-founded the Centre for Philosophy of Natural and Social Science (CPNSS) at the LSE and the Centre for Humanities Engaging Science and Society (CHESS) at the University of Durham.

Cartwright has mentored several students in England and the United States who have gone on to become professional philosophers of science, including Naomi Oreskes, Mauricio Suarez, Roman Frigg, Jeremy Howick, Peter Menzies, and Hasok Chang. She was also a supervisor of Saif al-Islam Gaddafi, a subsequent source of controversy.

Cartwright was married to the philosopher Stuart Hampshire until his death in 2004. She was also previously married to the philosopher Ian Hacking. She has two daughters, Emily and Sophie Hampshire Cartwright, and two granddaughters, Lucy Charlton and Tabitha Emily Cartwright Spray.

Philosophical work 

Cartwright's approach to the philosophy of science is associated with the "Stanford School" of Patrick Suppes, John Dupré, Peter Galison and Ian Hacking. It is characterized by an emphasis on scientific practice as opposed to abstract scientific theories. Cartwright has made important contributions to debates on laws of nature, causation and causal inference, scientific models in the natural and social sciences, objectivity and the unity of science. Her recent work focuses on evidence and its use in informing policy decisions.

Carl Hoefer describes Cartwright's philosophy in the following terms:

Honors and awards 

Cartwright served as the president of the Philosophy of Science Association (2009–10), as vice-president (2007–8) and president (2008–9) of the Pacific Division of the American Philosophical Association, and was elected to be President of the Division for Logic, Methodology and Philosophy of Science and Technology from 2020 to 2023. She is Professor Emeritus at the London School of Economics. She is also Fellow of the British Academy, a member of the American Academy of Arts and Sciences, a member of the German Academy of Sciences Leopoldina, and a Fellow of the Academy of Social Sciences. She has received honorary degrees from Southern Methodist University and the University of St Andrews as well as a MacArthur Fellowship.

Cartwright was the recipient of the Martin R. Lebowitz Prize for Philosophical Achievement of the Phi Beta Kappa Society 2017 (alongside Elliott Sober) and was awarded the Carl Gustav Hempel Award in 2018 by the Philosophy of Science Association.

In 2017 Cartwright was selected by the American Philosophical Association Committee to deliver The Paul Carus Lectures. The series was entitled 'Nature, the Artful Modeler: Lectures on Laws, Science, How Nature Arranges the World and How We Can Arrange It Better' and the lectures entitled: -

 Her raw materials: powers, 'mechanisms', and causes. She manages actual possibilities, obeys the Barcan formula, and does not sit down with counterfactuals.
 Her methods: our methods ... That's why ours work so well. But she is not a Kant, a Mussoloini, nor a Hilbert. Perhaps Isambard Brunel, Margaret Knight, or Mary Berry.
 Her limits: Picking up where Nature leaves off, building it better, and warranting your work.

Selected works

Books
  Translated to Chinese.
 Nature's Capacities and Their Measurement, Oxford University Press (October 1989) 
 The Dappled World: A Study of the Boundaries of Science, Cambridge University Press (September 1999) 
 Hunting Causes and Using Them: Approaches in Philosophy and Economics, Cambridge University Press (June 2007) . Translated to Chinese.
 Evidence Based Policy: A Practical Guide to Doing It Better, with Jeremy Hardie, Oxford University Press (2012)
 Philosophy of Social Science: a new introduction, with Eleonora Montuschi, Oxford University Press (2014)
 Improving Child Safety: deliberation, judgement and empirical research, with Munro, E., Hardie, J. and Montuschi, E. (2017)
 Nature, the Artful Modeler: Lectures on Laws, Science, How Nature Arranges the World and How We Can Arrange It Better (The Paul Carus Lectures). Open Court (2019)

Articles

References

External links

 Home page at Durham University website
Personal home page at https://www.profnancycartwright.com/

American women philosophers
20th-century American philosophers
21st-century American philosophers
Academics of the London School of Economics
Philosophers of education
Philosophers of science
Stanford University Department of Philosophy faculty
University of Illinois Chicago alumni
1944 births
Living people
Place of birth missing (living people)
MacArthur Fellows
University of Pittsburgh alumni
Fellows of the British Academy
Fellows of the Academy of Social Sciences
20th-century American women
21st-century American women